The men's 81 kilograms (Half middleweight) competition at the 2018 Asian Games in Jakarta was held on 30 August at the Jakarta Convention Center Assembly Hall.

Schedule
All times are Western Indonesia Time (UTC+07:00)

Results
Legend
WO — Won by walkover

Main bracket

Final

Top half

Bottom half

Repechage

References

External links
Official website
Official website

M81
Judo at the Asian Games Men's Half Middleweight